Lake Garancsi is a lake of Hungary.

References
Itthon.hu

Garancsi